Shashe-Mooke is a large village located in the Central District of Botswana. It had 3,380 inhabitants at the 2011 census.

See also
 List of cities in Botswana
 Mathangwane Village

References

Populated places in Botswana